Randy Jones (born July 23, 1981) is a Canadian former professional ice hockey player who played eight seasons in the  National Hockey League (NHL) with the Philadelphia Flyers, Los Angeles Kings, Tampa Bay Lightning and Winnipeg Jets. Jones is currently the head coach of the Brockville Braves hockey club.

Playing career
Jones played junior hockey with the Cobourg Cougars of the Ontario Provincial Junior A Hockey League. He played for Clarkson University in the NCAA from 2001 through 2003. On July 24, 2003, he was signed to a contract as a free agent by the Philadelphia Flyers. Jones eased his way into the Flyers lineup, spending most of his first season with their American Hockey League affiliate, the Philadelphia Phantoms. He played with the Phantoms through the 2004–05 NHL lockout, and the next season, he split games between the Phantoms and the Flyers. He played 66 games in the 2006–07 NHL season, and started the 2007–08 NHL season with the Flyers.

On October 27, 2007, he boarded Patrice Bergeron of the Boston Bruins. Bergeron was knocked unconscious and wheeled off on a stretcher, and then sent to the hospital. Jones was assessed a five-minute boarding major and a game misconduct. He issued an apology during the second period of the game. On October 29, it was announced that he had been suspended two games as a result of the hit. On the ruling, NHL Senior Executive Vice President of Hockey Operations Colin Campbell said, "While it is my determination that Jones did not intend to injure his opponent, he did deliver a hard check to a player who was in a vulnerable position." Bergeron did not play for the remainder of the season.

On July 2, 2008 the Flyers announced that they signed Jones to a two-year contract extension.  On September 26, 2009, the Flyers announced that they had placed Jones on waivers in order to clear up space under the salary cap. He cleared waivers and was assigned to the Adirondack Phantoms on September 30.  On October 29, 2009, Jones was claimed off re-entry waivers by the Los Angeles Kings.

After becoming an unrestricted free agent, Jones signed a one-year deal with the Tampa Bay Lightning on August 25, 2010. The following season he signed a one-year contract worth $1.15 million with the Winnipeg Jets on July 2, 2011.  Jones endured the NHL lockout as a free agent, and with a lack of NHL interest he was belatedly signed midway in to the 2012–13 season to a try-out with the Oklahoma City Barons of the AHL on February 3, 2013.

On October 28, 2013, the Portland Pirates of the AHL signed Jones to a professional tryout contract (PTO).

Career statistics

Awards and honors

References

External links
 

1981 births
Living people
Adirondack Phantoms players
Canadian ice hockey defencemen
Clarkson Golden Knights men's ice hockey players
Ice hockey people from New Brunswick
Los Angeles Kings players
Oklahoma City Barons players
People from Kings County, New Brunswick
Philadelphia Flyers players
Philadelphia Phantoms players
Portland Pirates players
Tampa Bay Lightning players
Undrafted National Hockey League players
Winnipeg Jets players